James Cannon (19 March 1927 – 26 January 1991) was a Scottish footballer who made 99 appearances in the Scottish Football League for Dunfermline Athletic, with whom he played on the losing side in the 1949 Scottish League Cup Final, St Johnstone and Albion Rovers, and 12 appearances in the English Football League for Darlington. An inside forward, he began his career with Blantyre Victoria, and also played for English Southern League club Kettering Town, for whom he scored five times from 21 appearances in all competitions.

Dunfermline teammate Willie McSeveney described him as "one of the cleverest footballers that I have ever seen in my life. He was the guy who invented dummies, he let the ball go through his legs, things like that."

References

1927 births
1991 deaths
Footballers from Coatbridge
Scottish footballers
Association football inside forwards
Blantyre Victoria F.C. players
Dunfermline Athletic F.C. players
St Johnstone F.C. players
Kettering Town F.C. players
Albion Rovers F.C. players
Darlington F.C. players
Scottish Football League players
English Football League players
Southern Football League players
Scottish Junior Football Association players